Sergei Stanislavovich Topol (born February 15, 1985) is a Russian ice hockey forward. He currently plays for HK Gomel of the Belarusian Extraleague.

Honours
Russian championship:  2004 (With Avangard Omsk)

Career statistics

External links

1985 births
Living people
Avangard Omsk players
Avtomobilist Yekaterinburg players
HK Gomel players
High1 players
HC Mechel players
Metallurg Novokuznetsk players
Molot-Prikamye Perm players
Rubin Tyumen players
Russian ice hockey left wingers
Saryarka Karagandy players
Sportspeople from Omsk
Sputnik Nizhny Tagil players
Vancouver Canucks draft picks
HC Vityaz players
Yermak Angarsk players